The men's boxing competition at the 2009 Jeux de la Francophonie took place between 29 September and 5 October. There were a total of 106 entrants competing in eleven different weight classes, following the classes that are contested in the Olympic boxing programme.

Medallists

Medal table

Participation
Key: Country (no. of athletes)

 (4)
 (3)
 (2)
 (4)
 (3)
 (5)
 (11)
 (2)
 (5)
 (2)
 (2)
 (6)
 (1)
 (8)
 (2)
 (7) (host)
 (3)
 (6)
 (9)
 (3)
 (4)
 (3)
 (2)
 (6)
 (3)

References
General
Livre des résultats. Jeux de la Francophonie (2009). Retrieved on 2009-10-09.
Specific

External links
Official website 

Sport in Lebanon
2009 Jeux de la Francophonie
Boxing at the Jeux de la Francophonie